VOB refers to a data structure on a DVD-video media. It may also refer to:

Versioned Object Base in Rational ClearCase
Voice over Broadband an application of Voice over Internet Protocol
A Vision of Britain, a website
Voice of Baceprot, Indonesian all-female rock trio